Heber Gastón Colmán Leguisamo (born 9 April 1989) is a Uruguayan professional footballer who plays as a forward for Uruguayan club Tacuarembó.

Career
At the age of 20, Colmán signed for Olimpia, Paraguay's most successful club, where he suffered a knee injury, causing him to be sidelined for nine months.

Before the second half of 2010–11, Colmán signed for Tacuarembó in Uruguay.

Before the 2016 season, he was sent on loan to Argentine side Atlético de Rafaela, where he found the football "much more dynamic" and made 9 league appearances and scored 0 goals.

Before the second half of 2018–19, Colmán signed for Santa Tecla in El Salvador.

In 2019, he returned to Uruguayan Segunda División team Tacuarembó.

References

External links
 
 

Uruguayan footballers
Living people
Expatriate footballers in El Salvador
Sud América players
Atlético de Rafaela footballers
Club Olimpia footballers
Santa Tecla F.C. footballers
C.A. Progreso players
Uruguayan expatriate footballers
Uruguayan expatriates in Argentina
People from Tacuarembó
1989 births
Tacuarembó F.C. players
Expatriate footballers in Paraguay
Paraguayan Primera División players
Uruguayan Primera División players
Uruguayan Segunda División players
Argentine Primera División players
Association football forwards
Primera División de Fútbol Profesional players
Expatriate footballers in Argentina